Democratic People's Party may refer to:

People's Democratic Party of Afghanistan, now abolished
Democratic People's Party (Germany)
Democratic People's Party (Ghana)
Democratic People's Party (Mauritania)
Democratic People's Party (Montenegro), a member of the Democratic Front coalition
Democratic People's Party (Namibia)
Democratic People's Party (Northern Cyprus)
Democratic People's Party (Nigeria)
Social Democratic Party (Portugal), known as the Democratic Peoples' Party from 1974 to 1976
Democratic People's Party (San Marino)
Democratic People's Party (South Korea)
Democratic People's Party (Turkey)

See also
Democratic Party (disambiguation) 
People's Party (disambiguation)
People's Democratic Party (disambiguation)